Luisa Christina Zissman  (born Louisa Christina Kalozois; 4 June 1987) is an English retail entrepreneur and reality television personality. She was the runner-up on the ninth series of The Apprentice and finished fourth on Celebrity Big Brother 13. She later became a presenter and regular panellist on Big Brother's Bit on the Side. Zissman is also one half of podcast LuAnna: The Podcast with Anna Williamson.

Early life and education
Zissman was born in Milton Keynes, Buckinghamshire to Mr and Mrs Zo Kalozois, now of Hertfordshire; her father is Greek. She attended the Grove Independent school in Loughton, Milton Keynes and Northampton High School for Girls.

Career
Zissman took her first job at an estate agent on Saturdays at 16 to pay the upkeep costs for a horse her parents bought for her. One of her first post-school jobs was at Electronic Data Systems, but she later stated that she decided to go into business because she disliked being told what to do.

She is based in St Albans, Hertfordshire, and she had her own baking website and eBay electronics business. Her cupcake shop – Dixie's Cupcakery, named after her daughter, is now closed. Although she claimed on several occasions that these three businesses have a net worth of £1.5 million, The Independent valued the three businesses, all trading names of Boutique Trading Ltd of which Zissman is listed as director and company secretary, at £194. They also noted that the eBay electronics store she owned was a "one-stop shop for several sellers, including electronics, baking and beauty products".

Zissman came to public attention when she appeared on the ninth series of The Apprentice in 2013, where she was runner-up. On 23 July 2013, Zissman appeared on BBC Radio 1's Innuendo Bingo. In November 2013 she launched her business, named Bakers Toolkit, at the Cake International Show. Earlier, there had been some debate about whether the name should include an apostrophe. She joined the thirteenth series of Celebrity Big Brother on 3 January 2014. She finished fourth overall behind Jim Davidson, Dappy and Ollie Locke. Zissman revealed she received a six-figure sum for her stint on the show. She also regularly appears on This Morning and Good Morning Britain as a guest to debate current new stories. She has since appeared on Reality Bites, News Thing, Loose Women and Sam & Billie: The Mummy Diaries on ITVBe.

Personal life
Zissman married her first husband, entrepreneur Oliver Zissman, in 2009. Zissman gave birth to her first daughter, Dixie in 2010.
Zissman and her husband divorced in 2014. While taking part in Celebrity Big Brother in 2014, she came out as bisexual, and had sought treatment for sex addiction. Zissman married her second husband, Irish businessman Andrew Collins, in 2015.

Controversy 
During the COVID-19 pandemic, Zissman posted on her Instagram page that she blamed the Chinese government for the spread of the disease, which some took offence to and considered to be racism, something she denied in follow-up posts.

References 

1987 births
Living people
English businesspeople
The Apprentice (British TV series) candidates
English people of Greek descent
Bisexual women
English bisexual people
English LGBT businesspeople
Bisexual businesspeople
People from St Albans
Television personalities from Hertfordshire
British women in business
Big Brother (British TV series) contestants